= Honoured Master of Sport of Uzbekistan =

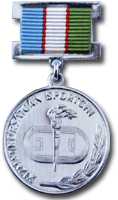
Badge of the title "Honoured Athlete of the Republic of Uzbekistan"

Honorary titles of Uzbekistan awarded to athletes by presidential decrees include:

"Uzbekiston iftikhori" (Uzbek: O’zbekiston iftixori – "Pride of Uzbekistan") — established by the Law of the Republic of Uzbekistan on 28 August 1998.

The honorary title "Uzbekiston iftikhori" is awarded to citizens of the Republic of Uzbekistan who have achieved champion status at World Championships, the Olympic Games, or equivalent international sporting events, and who have contributed to enhancing the prestige, honor, and glory of the homeland. (This title is not limited to athletes.)

"Honoured Athlete of the Republic of Uzbekistan" (Uzbek: O’zbekiston Respublikasida xizmat ko’rsatgan sportchi) — established by the Law of the Republic of Uzbekistan on 26 April 1996.

The honorary title "Honoured Athlete of the Republic of Uzbekistan" is awarded to world champions and record holders, Olympic and Asian Games medalists, and other athletes who have achieved outstanding results in sports competitions.
